Li Ji may refer to:

People
Li Ji (concubine) (died 651 BC), concubine of Duke Xian of Jin
 Other Consorts surnamed Li or titled Li Ji in Consort Li (disambiguation)
Li Ji (Han dynasty) (fl. 180 BC), a Chinese general of the Han dynasty; see 
Li Shiji (594–669), also named Li Ji, Chinese general of Tang dynasty
Li Ji (archeologist) (1896–1979), Chinese archeologist
Li Ji (runner) (born 1979), Chinese athlete
Li Ji (swimmer) (born 1986), Chinese swimmer

Other uses
Book of Rites, or Li Ji
Li Ji slays the Giant Serpent (Chinese legend)

See also
Ji Li (disambiguation)
Li Chi (disambiguation), the Wade–Giles romanization of Li Ji
Li Jie (disambiguation)